Sulíkov is a municipality and village in Blansko District in the South Moravian Region of the Czech Republic. It has about 300 inhabitants.

Administrative parts
The village of Vřesice is an administrative part of Sulíkov.

References

Villages in Blansko District